The SP2 is a sports car developed by Volkswagen do Brasil for the Brazilian market, and produced from 1972 until 1976. It is based on the Brazilian market Volkswagen 1600 Variant. The abbreviation "SP" is said to have stood for São Paulo or, according to other sources, for Special Project, Sport Prototype, Special Performance or SPort-Car.

Origins of the project
In the 1970s, the Brazilian market was closed for imports. The only sports car officially made there was the aging (and by then retired) Volkswagen Karmann Ghia, and its successor, the Karmann Ghia TC. Only independent car makers were able to fill the gap, notably Puma, Santa Matilde and Miura.

"Project X"
On March 1, 1968, Rudolf Wilhelm Karl Leiding (the CEO of the subsidiary and later of the entire company) took over the management of Volkswagen do Brasil in São Bernardo do Campo. In 1970, he launched "Project X": a sports car was to polish up Volkswagen's staid image in Brazil. In Márcio Lima Piancastelli and José Vicente Novita Martins, Leiding found designers who were as talented as they were eager. The lead engineer was initially Dr. Paulo Iványi, later Wilhelm Schmiemann. The result was a model study that was the first Volkswagen to wear the "Leiding face" later copied for example on the German VW 412. The model study was presented on March 24, 1971, at the German industrial fair in São Paulo, Aréa do Parvilhão da Bienal do Parque do Ibirapuera.

Three companies were involved in the creation and production of the VW do Brasil sports coupe:

- Volkswagen do Brasil, Factory 2 in São Paulo: design, engineering and development of the VW SP.

- Volkswagen do Brasil, Anchieta factory in São Bernardo do Campo: production of all sheet metal parts. Production of chassis, engines, transmissions and axles on a special production line.

- Karmann-Ghia do Brasil in São Bernardo do Campo: Production of the bodyshells from sheet metal supplied by Volkswagen in pure manual labor together with the Karmann Ghia TC on a production line.

- Volkswagen do Brasil, Anchieta factory in São Bernardo do Campo: Painting of the body shells welded at Karmann-Ghia for quality reasons.

- Karmann-Ghia do Brasil in São Bernardo do Campo: "Marriage" of the bodies painted at Volkswagen with the floor assemblies completed at Volkswagen and completion of the vehicles.

- Volkswagen do Brasil, Anchieta factory in São Bernardo do Campo: Final inspection and delivery of the sports coupés delivered ready for sale by Karmann-Ghia do Brasil.

- Volkswagen do Brasil, Factory 2 in São Paulo: Production-related vehicle testing on the local test track.

Specifications
The production SP2 was based on the platform of the Brazilian VW 1600 Variant with a front axle from the VW Beetle, but had a four-cylinder boxer engine - engine code "BL" - enlarged to 1700 ccm  (flat radiator, as in the Type 3). This had 65 (DIN) hp and gave the SP2 a top speed of 161 km/h with a standard consumption of 10.5 L/100 km. The SP2 needed 17.4 seconds to sprint to 100 km/h. In addition, there was a weaker and more sparsely equipped version of the SP1 with a 54 (DIN) hp 1.6-liter boxer engine and 149 km/h top speed - engine code "BV" - which was discontinued in July 1974.

Despite its sleek shape, the SP was significantly slower than the Puma, for example, although both models had very similar engines. However, the Puma was much lighter because of its GRP body.

The SP had two trunks; a 140-liter one under the front hood and a 205-liter compartment in the rear, accessible via a large hatch. Despite many good features, the SP found too few buyers. As a result, SP2 production was ended in February 1976. A total of 10,206 units were produced, of which about 680 were exported (officially not to Europe). A 1973 example repainted by Volkswagen do Brasil from Astral Blue metallic to Lotus White can be seen in the collection of the Volkswagen AutoMuseum Foundation in Wolfsburg. The SP2 cost 29,700 cruzeiros (about 16,000 German marks at the time) in Brazil.

Both SP models were plagued by a certain lack of power; according to a contemporary joke, the SP in the model name stood for "Sem Potência," Portuguese for "without power".

Decline
A car named SP1 was also built, similar in almost every aspects but the engine, logo and a few trim items. However, due to its very poor performance ( from a 1,600 ccm engine), it was soon discontinued, after only 84 units were built. Despite being praised by critics for its looks, the SP2 failed to beat its main competitor, the Puma, in the performance category. Although they used similar engines, the fiberglass-bodied Puma was much lighter. This resulted in low sales, and the SP2 was discontinued in February 1976.

In total, 10,205 units were made; 670 were exported, of which 155 went to Nigeria. The car is now sought as a valuable collector's item. A white SP2 is displayed in AutoMuseum Volkswagen. While prices during the production time frame were roughly the same as almost two VW Beetles, the price of a well-preserved example today is considerably higher than other VW models of its age.

Successor attempts
To remedy the VW SP2's lack of power, there were several attempts and different approaches. In this context, the following two attempts will be briefly presented:

Volkswagen do Brasil developed the prototype Volkswagen SP3. The VW SP3 had the chassis and engine of the VW Passat TS with a water-cooled 1.6-liter in-line four-cylinder, a compression ratio of 7.5:1, dual carburetors, and an output of 85 SAE horsepower. Testing for the VW SP3 was already so far advanced that Volkswagen planned to unveil it at the 10th Motor Show in November 1976. But this did not happen for reasons of company policy.

The idea of creating a successor model to the VW SP2 was taken up by the vehicle manufacturer Dacon S.A. in São Paulo. Dacon based its SP3 on the floor assembly of the VW SP2. Externally, the Dacon SP3 differed from the VW SP2 by its smooth surfaces without the red, wraparound side trim and black rubber protection, and by 6J×13 rims (from the Passat). The VW SP's characteristic air intakes gave way to discrete slots on the rear side windows, and a wide black grille sat above the front bumper. The 1.8-liter, 8.5:1 compression ratio engine produced 100 SAE hp and remained in the rear; the engine compartment also housed the air conditioning compressor. In the front, however, sat the water cooler. The interior featured leather-trimmed Porsche seats (Dacon was also a Porsche dealer until imports were banned). Transmission, suspension and brakes (discs in front, drums in the rear) were the same as the SP2, but parts were adapted and reinforced to the higher power. The prototype reached a top speed of 180 km/h and was manufactured at Karmann-Ghia do Brasil. The starting point for the Dacon SP3 was always a VW SP2. The end of production of the VW SP2 at the end of February 1976 was therefore problematic for Dacon. However, due to the extremely high price (the conversion of a VW SP2 to a Dacon SP3 alone was to cost 20% more than a brand-new Puma GTE), demand was very low.

A new Volkswagen sports car directly inspired by the SP2 was considered for the Brazilian market, based on the Golf's platform. It got to the stage where 1:4 scale models produced, but did not progress due to disappointing sales of the similar Scirocco in Europe.

Books

The history of SP2 and its technical specifications are described in the 2021 book VW SP - A história de um ícone. The book was written in Portuguese by Juan Dierckx, a SP2 enthusiast living in Brazil.

In February 2022, an even more detailed book on the history and technology of the VW SP2 was published in German by Claus-Thomas Bues, owner of a VW SP2 since 1987.

Pictures

References

External links

 Marcio Piancastelli (designer) 
 Mundo VOLKSWAGEN SP2 - Facebook Group for fans of the VW SP2
 About SP1 and SP2 
 Club of enthusiasts of the model, with pictures (inclusive of the SP3 prototype, in ads of the time) 
 Technical data
 German and English web page about this rare car
 German, English and Portuguese web page with a lot of stuff

SP2
Cars of Brazil
Rear-engined vehicles
Cars powered by boxer engines
Rear-wheel-drive vehicles
Sports cars
Coupés
Cars introduced in 1972